This is the electoral history of Adlai Stevenson II, who served as Governor of Illinois (1949–1953) and 5th United States Ambassador to the United Nations (1961–1965), and was twice the Democratic Party's nominee for President of the United States, losing both the 1952 and 1956 presidential general elections to Republican Dwight D. Eisenhower.

Stevenson was elected as a Democrat in the 1948 Illinois gubernatorial election. In 1952, he had won his party's nomination to seek a second term as governor. However, he was nominated as his party's presidential nominee at the 1952 Democratic National Convention, being successfully drafted at the convention. As a result, Stevenson had to withdraw from the gubernatorial election in order to run for president. Stevenson and his running mate John Sparkman lost the presidential election to the Republican ticket of Dwight D. Eisenhower and Richard Nixon.

In 1956, he successfully sought to again receive his party's nomination for president. He and his running mate Estes Kefauver lost to the Republican ticket of Eisenhower and Nixon. 

At the 1960 Democratic National Convention, Stevenson launched a late effort to again receive his party's nomination, but this was unsuccessful, and John F. Kennedy was nominated for president instead.

Gubernatorial

1948

1952

Presidential

1952

Democratic primaries
1952 Democratic Party presidential primaries:
 Estes Kefauver - 3,169,448 (65.04%)
 Pat Brown - 485,578 (9.97%)
 Richard Russell, Jr. - 371,179 (7.62%)
 Matthew M. Neely - 191,471 (3.93%)
 Robert J. Bulkley - 184,880 (3.79%)
 Hubert Humphrey - 102,527 (2.10%)
 Adlai Stevenson - 81,096 (1.66%)
 Dwight Eisenhower - 64,911 (1.33%)
 Harry S. Truman (inc.) - 62,345 (1.28%)
 Unpledged delegates - 46,361 (0.95%)
 Robert S. Kerr - 45,285 (0.93%)
 William O. Douglas - 29,532 (0.61%)
 W. Averell Harriman - 19,806 (0.41%)
 Jerome F. Fox - 18,322 (0.38%)

Democratic National Convention balloting

General election

1956

Democratic primaries
1956 Democratic Party presidential primaries:
 Adlai Stevenson II - 3,069,504 (50.70%)
 Estes Kefauver - 2,283,172 (37.71%)
 Unpledged delegates - 380,300 (6.28%)
 Frank J. Lausche - 278,074 (4.59%)
 John W. McCormack - 26,128 (0.43%)
 Dwight D. Eisenhower - 6,358 (0.11%)
 W. Averell Harriman - 3,368 (0.06%)
 Robert Meyner - 1,129 (0.02%)
 John F. Kennedy - 949 (0.02%)
 Harry S. Truman - 728 (0.01%)
 Stuart Symington - 402 (0.01%)
 Paul A. Dever - 207 (0.00%)
 Lyndon B. Johnson - 2 (0.00%)
 Others - 3,610 (0.06%)

Democratic National Convention balloting

General election

1960

Democratic primaries
1960 Democratic Party presidential primaries:
 John F. Kennedy - 1,847,259 (31.43%)
 Pat Brown - 1,354,031 (23.04%)
 George H. McLain - 646,387 (11.00%)
 Hubert Humphrey - 590,410 (10.05%)
 George Smathers - 322,235 (5.48%)
 Michael DiSalle - 315,312 (5.37%)
 Unpledged delegates - 241,958 (4.12%)
 Albert S. Potter - 208,057 (3.54%)
 Wayne Morse - 147,262 (2.51%)
 Adlai Stevenson - 51,833 (0.88%)

Democratic National Convention balloting

Maps

References

Stevenson, Adlai
Adlai Stevenson II